is a Japanese transportation company established on June 18, 1910, that operates streetcars and buses in and around Hiroshima Prefecture.

The company's rolling stock includes an eclectic range of trams manufactured from across Japan and Europe, earning it the nickname "The Moving Streetcar Museum".

From January 2008 the company has accepted PASPY, a smart card ticket system.

The atomic bombing of Hiroshima took place on 6 August 1945. 185 employees of the company were killed as a result of the bomb and 108 of its 123 cars were damaged or destroyed. Within three days, the system started running again. Three trams that survived or were rebuilt after the bombing continue to run 75 years afterwards.

Railway and streetcar
One Railway line with one route for 16.1 km. (Miyajima Line)
between Hiroden-nishi-hiroshima Station and Hiroden-miyajima-guchi Station.
trains(trams) link up with other lines from Nishi-Hiroshima.
Six Streetcar inner-city lines with eight routes for 19.0 km.
Operates 271 streetcars.
The company has the longest and busiest streetcar service in Japan.

Key terminal stations
Hiroshima Station (connect to JR Hiroshima Station) 
Yokogawa Station (connect to JR Yokogawa Station)
Hiroshima Port Station (connect with ferries and hydrofoils for Matsuyama, Imabari, Kure, Miyajima, Etajima and some other islands in Seto Inland Sea)
Hondori Station (connect to Astram Line Hondori Station)
Hakushima Station
Eba Station
Hiroden-nishi-hiroshima Station (connect to JR Nishi-Hiroshima Station)
Hiroden-miyajima-guchi Station (connect to JR Miyajimaguchi Station and JR Miyajima Ferry and Miyajima Matsudai Kisen ferries for Miyajima)

List of lines and routes
Hiroden Streetcar Lines and Routes

Bus services
City area 
No.2:  - Hiroshima Station - Fuchū
No.3: Hiroshima Station - Hacchōbori - Kamiyachō -  - Kan'on
No.4: Prefecture office - Hiroshima Station - Niho/Mukainada
No.5: Ushita - Hiroshima Station - 
No.6: Ushita - Hatchōbori - Kamiyachō - City Hall - Funairi - Eba
No.7: (Yokogawa Station - Tokaichi-machi - ) Kamiyachō - City Hall - University Hospital - Niho/Mukainada
 The bus runs only in morning between Yokogawa - Kamiyacho 
No.8: Yokogawa - Kan'on
No.10: Nishi-Hiroshima Station - City Hall - University Hospital
No.12: Hesaka - Hacchōbori - Miyuki-Bashi - Niho/ - Asahimachi/ - Hondōri - Miyuki-Bashi - Niho (Express)
The route for Asahimachi and Express bus only runs in rush time.
No.13: Hiroshima Station - Inari-machi - Chuden-mae - City Hall
Suburb area
28 Bus routes for the suburbs. Most suburban lines departs from 
 North: For Asaminami and Asakita ward, and Yoshida, Toyohira, Sandan-kyō(via Chūgoku Expressway or Route 191) and Miyoshi(via Chūgoku Expressway)
 For Asa zoo and Asahigaoka, the bus departs from Hiroshima Station and not via Bus Center.
 West: For Koi, West ward, Saeki ward, Hatsukaichi
 Some buses start from Hiroshima Station or Hacchōbori. 
1 through Bus route to Kure(Clare Line)
6 Superhighway bus routes around Chūgoku region and Tokyo.
routes between Masuda, Hamada, Matsue, Yonago, Tottori and Tokyo.
Hiroshima Airport Limousine bus.
Operate 489 Buses.

Main bus stations
 Hiroshima Bus Center, the main terminal bus station in central Hiroshima

See also

Green Mover Max
List of light-rail transit systems

References

External links

Hiroshima Electric Railway
Streetcars in the Hiroden system

 
Companies based in Hiroshima Prefecture
Railway companies of Japan
Bus companies of Japan
Articles containing video clips
Railway companies established in 1910
Japanese companies established in 1910
Companies listed on the Tokyo Stock Exchange